The 11th annual Berlin International Film Festival was held from 23 June to 4 July 1961. The Golden Bear was awarded to the Italian film La notte directed by Michelangelo Antonioni.

Jury
The following people were announced as being on the jury for the festival:

International feature film jury
 James Quinn, producer (United Kingdom) - Jury President
 France Roche, journalist, film critic, actress and screenwriter (France)
 Marc Turfkruyer, film critic (Belgium)
 Satyajit Ray, director (India)
 Gian Luigi Rondi, film critic (Italy)
 Hirotsugu Ozaki, theatre critic (Japan)
 Nicholas Ray, director (United States)
 Falk Harnack, director and screenwriter (West Germany)
 Hans Schaarwächter, journalist and writer (West Germany)

International documentary and short jury
 Willem de Vogel, actor (Netherlands) - Jury President
 Else Goelz, journalist (West Germany)
 Mohammed Gamal Eldin Rifaat, (United Arab Emirates)
 Luis Gómez Mesa, film critic and writer (Spain)
 Max Lippmann, film critic (West Germany)
 Ingeborg Lyche, chairperson of the Statens Filmsentral (Norway)
 Flávio R. Tambellini, producer (Brazil)

Films in competition
The following films were in competition for the Golden Bear award:

Key
{| class="wikitable" width="550" colspan="1"
| style="background:#FFDEAD;" align="center"| †
|Winner of the main award for best film in its section
|}

Awards

The following prizes were awarded by the Jury:

International jury awards
 Golden Bear: La notte by Michelangelo Antonioni
 Silver Bear: Makkers Staakt uw Wild Geraas by Fons Rademakers
 Silver Bear for Best Director: Bernhard Wicki for Das Wunder des Malachias
 Silver Bear for Best Actress: Anna Karina for Une femme est une femme
 Silver Bear for Best Actor: Peter Finch for No Love for Johnnie
 Silver Bear Extraordinary Jury Prize: 마부 Mabu by Kang Dae-jin
 Silver Bear Extraordinary Jury Prize: Une femme est une femme by Jean-Luc Godard

Documentaries and short films jury awards
 Golden Bear (Documentaries): Description d'un combat by Chris Marker
 Silver Bear special prize (Documentaries): Traumland der Sehnsucht by Wolfgang Müller-Sehn
 Short Film Golden Bear: Gesicht von der Stange? by Raimund Ruehl
 Silver Bear for Best Short Film: Chimichimito by José Martín
 Silver Bear Extraordinary Jury Prize (Short film): ex aequoDe lage landen by George SluizerLo specchio, la tigre e la pianura by Raffaele AndreassiSirènes by Emile DegelinMorning on the Lièvre by David Bairstow

Independent jury awards
FIPRESCI Award
La notte by Michelangelo Antonioni
OCIC Award
Question 7 by Stuart Rosenberg
C.I.D.A.L.C. Award
La patota by Daniel Tinayre

Youth Film Award
Best Feature Film Suitable for Young People: Question 7 by Stuart Rosenberg
Best Documentary Film Suitable for Young People: Description d'un combat by Chris Marker
Best Short Film Suitable for Young People: De lage landen by George Sluizer
Honorable Mention: Gesicht von der Stange? by Raimund Ruehl

References

External links
 11th Berlin International Film Festival 1961
1961 Berlin International Film Festival
Berlin International Film Festival:1961  at Internet Movie Database

11
1961 film festivals
1961 in West Germany
1960s in West Berlin